Marie & Gali is a Japanese anime created by Izumi Todo. It aired on NHK from March 30, 2009, until March 22, 2011, for a total of 70 episodes of five minutes each. It was the first anime (in over three decades) produced by Toei Animation to be broadcast on the NHK-E educational channel since 1978's Captain Future. 
A sequel, Marie & Gali ver.2.0 aired from March 30, 2010, until March 22, 2011.

Plot 

The anime follows Marika, a student who loves the gothic lolita aesthetic, but falls asleep as soon as someone starts talking about science. One day, after a nap on the train, she discovers that her stuffed animal, Pet, is able to move and ends up in the strange city of Galihabara. Here, Marika meets the astronomer Galileo and other famous scientists, and with a bit of their help, starts to appreciate science little by little.

Episodes 

Characters 

.
 Marie is a young student who dresses in gothic lolita style. She does not like science, but once she arrives in Galihabara, she begins to appreciate it day by day. She was born on December 12th.

The hand-sewn plush by Marika. When Marie arrives in Galihabara, Pet begins to move, but cannot speak due to Pet lacking a mouth. Despite having a bow on his head, he is a boy.

Appears in the second season and is an elementary school girl who dresses in Sweet Lolita style. She hates science and is very childish.

Appears in the second season and is the plush of Norika. She is a female, and, when she gets angry, becomes gigantic.

Nicknamed "Gali", he is a supporter of Copernican theory and the heliocentric system. He works at the observatory and was born on February 15th.

A beautiful and intelligent lady, runs a bar and a pension in Galihabara.

A tall, handsome man selling apples. His beauty makes him narcissistic and he attracts many women. He hates insects.

He is a robust man who has a ramen shop.

During the day he works part-time at Edison's appliance store, while at night he is a DJ.

He runs the "Syracuse" wind temple in the Greek quarter. When he finds something, he has a habit of screaming "Eureka!"

)
He is a grandfather with a beard and rival of Galileo.

Developer of the theory of evolution, he is a robot.

He obtained several patents at a young age and is a stingy man, owner of the Galihabara electronics store. He is in love with Norika.

He appears in the second season and is an astronaut.

Media

Video games 
A video game,  was developed by DORASU for the Nintendo DS and released in Japan on April 15, 2010.

References

External links

Official Marie & Gali website at Toei Animation 

NHK original programming
Toei Animation television
Comedy anime and manga